Agustín Malet Raga (born 7 July 1967 in Sevilla) is a  Spanish rugby union player. He plays as a back-row.

Career
His first international cap was during a match against Andorra, at Andorra la Vella, on 8 November 1997. He was part of the 1999 Rugby World Cup roster, playing two matches.

External links
 Andrei Kovalenco International Statistics
 Andrei Kovalenco Interview (Spanish)

1967 births
Living people
Sportspeople from Seville
Spanish rugby union players
Spain international rugby union players
Rugby union number eights